3 Quarks Daily  is an online news aggregator and blog that curates commentary, essays, and multimedia from selected periodicals, newspapers, journals, and blogs. The focus is on literature, the arts, politics, current affairs, science, philosophy, gossip–and, as stated on their web site–"anything else we deem inherently fascinating." Each day of the week from Tuesday through Sunday features about a dozen items culled from the World Wide Web. Each Monday is devoted to an online magazine which has essays and other previously unpublished content by editors and guest columnists. The stated aim of 3QD is to offer “a one-stop intellectual surfing experience by culling good stuff from all over and putting it in one place.”

3 Quarks Daily also awards annual prizes, called “quarks,” for exceptional writing in the blogosphere, as well as organizing quarterly online symposia on international issues.  The blog commands a significant readership and readers follow it in a variety of ways: through an email subscription and an RSS feed, as well as through social media updates via Twitter and Facebook.

History 
Author, engineer, and philosopher S. Abbas Raza founded 3 Quarks Daily in 2004 to serve as a conduit for content across disciplines for the web-based intellectual everyman. Unlike similar blogs of the time, such as Arts & Letters Daily and Andrew Sullivan's The Daily Dish, 3QD would explore topics beyond the humanities and feature science content as well as commentary on current events.  In fact, Abbas Raza says that Arts & Letters Daily, "was one of the main inspirations for my starting 3 Quarks Daily." The first post was on Saturday, July 31, 2004, and featured the 1904 Constantine Cavafy poem Waiting for the Barbarians.

The new aggregator site grew rapidly, reaching a thousand posts within seven months; by 2014 that number had reached thirty-five thousand. Since then, 3 Quarks Daily has culled content from hundreds of sources, from blogs such as Salon, Science Daily, and The Huffington Post, from major publications such as The New York Times, Nature, and The Guardian, to smaller outlets such as Guernica Magazine, The Awl, and The American Scholar.

The name 3 Quarks Daily comes from the elementary nuclear particles of physics which in turn were named after the word quark which James Joyce had used in Finnegans Wake.
The confluence of references to both science and literature in a single word suited the intent of the blog perfectly and the founders also thought that the name would be short and memorable.  They named their top three annual prizes the Top Quark (1st), the Strange Quark (2nd), and the Charm Quark (3rd).

The DAG-3QD Peace And Justice Symposia
Since 2012 3 Quarks Daily has teamed up with the Amsterdam-based Dialogue Advisory Group (DAG) to present online dialogues on topics of international peace and justice.  Occasionally, as in the 2013 symposium on drones, a book is published. As of October 2015 there have been six such symposia as shown below.

The Quark Prizes
In 2009, in the interest of encouraging and rewarding good writing in the blogosphere, 3QD announced that it would be awarding annual cash prizes, in Science, Arts & Literature, Politics, and Philosophy for the three best blog posts in each of these four fields. The selection process is as follows:  After several weeks during which nominees are submitted by 3QD readers and editors, the four principal editors of 3QD (Abbas Raza, Robin Varghese, Morgan Meis, and Azra Raza) narrow the list down to six articles in each category. A prominent intellectual such as Steven Pinker, Richard Dawkins, or Lewis Lapham is chosen in each of the four areas to select the final winners. The prizes are whimsically named the Top Quark (first prize of $500), the Strange Quark (second prize of $200), and the Charm Quark (third prize of $100). Originally the prize amounts were twice as big. Not every prize is awarded every year, and no prizes at all were awarded in 2013.

Due to logistical and financial reasons, the Quark Prizes were discontinued after 2015. A complete list of prizes awarded between 2009 and 2015 is shown below.

Reception

The 3 Quarks Daily blog has been praised by prominent authors and scientists including Richard Dawkins, Christopher Lydon, Steven Pinker, Daniel Dennett, Andrew Sullivan, Ken Roth, Laura Claridge, John Allen Paulos, and Thomas Manuel.

Guest columnists
The Monday magazine is not completely the creation of the 3QD editors; guest columnists are frequently invited. Prominent guest contributors have included:

 Marko Ahtisaari
 Arjun Appadurai 
 Stephen T. Asma
 Hartosh Singh Bal
 Pranab Bardhan
 Akeel Bilgrami
 Mark Blyth
 Maarten Boudry
 Paul Braterman
 Alexander Cooley
 Gerald Dworkin
 Jennifer Cody Epstein
 Julia Galef
 Mohsin Hamid
 Shadab Zeest Hashmi
 Pervez Hoodbhoy
 Allen M. Hornblum
 Sue Hubbard
 Ahmed Humayun
 Tasneem Zehra Husain
 Sam Kean
 Amitava Kumar
 Laila Lalami
 Kenan Malik
 Suketu Mehta
 Martha Nussbaum
 John Allen Paulos
 Robert Pinsky
 Steven Poole
 Huw Price
 Asad Raza
 Bruce Robbins
 Andy Schmookler
 Andrea Scrima
 Bapsi Sidhwa
 Justin E. H. Smith
 Terese Svoboda
 Robert B. Talisse
 Bilal Tanweer
 Frans De Waal

References

External links
 Official website
 S. Abbas Raza interviews Richard Dawkins

American news websites
2004 establishments in the United States
News aggregators
Internet properties established in 2004